Josefsson is a Swedish surname meaning "son of Josef". Notable people with the surname include:

Carl Josefsson (1895–1974), Swedish ice hockey player
Enar Josefsson (1916–1989), former Swedish cross-country skier
Ari Jósefsson (1939–1964), Icelandic poet
Carl Josefsson, Swedish Judge at the Svea Court of Appeal in Stockholm
Daniel Josefsson (born 1981), Swedish professional ice hockey player
Janne Josefsson (born 1957), Swedish investigative journalist
Helena Josefsson, Swedish singer and songwriter
Erik Josefsson (ice hockey) (born 1987), Swedish professional ice hockey player

See also
Josephson

Patronymic surnames
Swedish-language surnames
Surnames from given names